Comment may refer to:

Computing
 Comment (computer programming), explanatory text or information embedded in the source code of a computer program
 Comment programming, a software development technique based on the regular use of comment tags

Law
 Public comment, a term used by various U.S. government agencies, referring to comments invited regarding a report or proposal
 Short scholarly papers written by members of a law review
 Comments on proposed rules under the rulemaking process in United States administrative law

Media and entertainment
 Comment (TV series), a 1958 Australian television series 
Comment (album), a 1970 album by Les McCann
 "Comment", a 1969 song by Charles Wright & the Watts 103rd Street Rhythm Band
 Comment, a quarterly journal published by Cardus
 Comment, later aCOMMENT, an Australian quarterly literary magazine published 1940-7
 Comment section, a user-generated content feature of Web content allowing readers to publish comments

Other
 Comment (linguistics) or rheme, that which is said about the topic (theme) of a sentence
 Bernard Comment (born 1960), Swiss writer and publisher

See also
 
 Commentary (disambiguation)
 Comment spam (disambiguation)
 Internet commentator (disambiguation)
 Remark (disambiguation)
 Annotation, an explanation included with other data
 Footnote, a note at the bottom of a page
 Obiter dictum, a remark or observation made by a judge that does not form a necessary part of the court's decision